Thiophaeococcus fuscus is a Gram-negative and motile  bacterium from the genus of Thiophaeococcus has been isolated from black sand from a lagoon.

References 

Chromatiales
Bacteria described in 2014